The Herreshoff was an automobile built in both Detroit, Michigan, and Troy, New York, by the Herreshoff Motor Company from 1909 to 1914. The Herreshoff started as a small car with a 24 hp (18 kW) four-cylinder engine, and was made with three different models. Later models were upgraded to six-cylinder engines up to 3.8 liters capacity. For 1911, Herreshoff had a roadster with a rudimentary rumble seat at US$950; by contrast, the high-volume Oldsmobile Runabout went for US$650, the Ford Model N and Western's Gale Model A were US$500, the Black was $375, and the Success, US$250.

A light car with a 16 hp (12 kW) engine was introduced in 1914. Fisher produced bodies for the company.

The Herreshoff Motor Company was founded by Charles Frederick Herreshoff (1876–1954), nephew of famed yacht builder Captain Nathanael Greene Herreshoff I.  In addition to the aforementioned roadster (the Model 25), the company in 1911 offered a Touring Car, Tourabout and Runabout, each $1500.

Notes

References

See also
List of defunct United States automobile manufacturers

Defunct motor vehicle manufacturers of the United States
Motor vehicle manufacturers based in Michigan
History of Detroit
Defunct manufacturing companies based in New York (state)
Motor vehicle manufacturers based in New York (state)
Defunct manufacturing companies based in Detroit